Dedovsky is a rural locality (a khutor) in Yermolayevsky Selsoviet, Kuyurgazinsky District, Bashkortostan, Russia. The population was 8 as of 2010. There is 1 street.

Geography 
Dedovsky is located 15 km southwest of Yermolayevo (the district's administrative centre) by road. Molokanovo is the nearest rural locality.

References 

Rural localities in Kuyurgazinsky District